Cleveland Lowellyn "Cleve" Robinson (December 12, 1914 – August 23, 1995) was an American labor organizer, and civil rights activist.  He was a key figure in the 1963 March on Washington for Jobs and Freedom for which he acted as the Chairman of the Administrative Committee.

Life
Cleveland Robinson was born in Swabys Hope, in Manchester, Jamaica. After serving as a local constable and an elementary school teacher, he emigrated to the U.S. in 1944. 
When he arrived he took a job in a Manhattan dry goods store and very soon became active in District 65. 
In 1947 he owned his own shop; he went on to become a steward, and then a full-time organizer for the union. 
He was elected vice-president in 1950 and later in 1952 became secretary-treasurer. 
He held that position until he retired in 1992. 
When District 65 was affiliated with the Retail, Wholesale and Department Store Workers Union, Robinson held the positions of international vice-president and executive board member of that union. 
After disagreements with the retail, wholesale and department store workers union District 65 pulled out and organized the National Council of Distributive Workers of America and Robinson was elected president of the new body. 
In 1981, District 65 was affiliated with the United Auto Workers. At that time the union had 33,000 members in 37 states, Canada and Puerto Rico.

Robinson was a stalwart of the civil rights movement. 
In 1957, he participated in the Prayer Pilgrimage for Freedom. 
He was the chairman and one of the key organizers of the August 1963 March on Washington for Jobs and Freedom. 
In September 1972, he helped to found the Coalition of Black Trade Unionists (CBTU), successor organization to the Negro American Labor Council (NALC), and served as its first vice-president.

Robinson suffered from glaucoma for many years, and was legally blind in 1970. 
His level of commitment and activity was in no way impaired by this disability. 
He never lost touch with his Jamaican origins and traveled to the island often, keeping up a keen interest in a number of Jamaican-American political, cultural and fraternal organizations.

Robinson died of kidney failure in New York City in August 1995.
His papers are held by the Tamiment Library & Robert F. Wagner Labor Archives, New York University.

Family
His first wife was Sue Eliza Robinson, they had two sons and a daughter. 
When she died in 1976, he married Doreen Mcpherson Robinson.

References

External links

Cleveland Robinson, Coalition of Black Trade Unionists 
http://findarticles.com/p/articles/mi_m1355/is_n19_v88/ai_17445399
Alkalimat, Abdul. The African American Experience in Cyberspace. Pluto Press, 1994.
Cleveland Robinson Papers at Tamiment Library and Robert F. Wagner Labor Archives at New York University

American trade union leaders
American people of Jamaican descent
Deaths from kidney failure
1914 births
1995 deaths
American blind people
20th-century American businesspeople